Alfonso de Galarreta Genua,  (born 14 January 1957), is a Spanish-born Argentine bishop of the Society of Saint Pius X. Bishop de Galarreta has served as the First Assistant of the Society of Saint Pius X, working under the direction of the Superior General Fr. Davide Pagliarani, since 2018.  In addition to this, Bishop de Galaretta has been the President of the SSPX—Vatican Commission since 2009, which directs the Society's correspondence with the Holy See.

Born in Cantabria in northern Spain, he migrated to Argentina as a child. Alfonso de Galarreta underwent priestly formation at the International Seminary of Saint Pius X at Écône, Switzerland, before being ordained a priest by Archbishop Marcel Lefebvre at Buenos Aires in 1980. The Society represented a traditional Catholic pushback against the liberalising implications of the Second Vatican Council. Alfonso de Galarreta was one of four SSPX priests (along with Frs. Bernard Fellay, Bernard Tissier de Mallerais and Richard Williamson) who were consecrated as Bishops during the Écône consecrations in 1988. The consecrations were carried out by two bishops of the Catholic Church, Archbishop Lefebvre and Bishop Antônio de Castro Mayer, as an "emergency measure" due to Modernism in the Catholic Church, but without the permission of Rome, and thus Pope John Paul II claimed in his Ecclesia Dei motu proprio that the men had incurred latae sententiae excommunication on account of disobedience. 

The SSPX denied the legal validity of the excommunication, saying that the consecrations were necessary due to a moral and theological crisis in the Catholic Church and thus continued to operate regardless. After the consecrations, Bishop de Galarreta became the Rector of the Our Lady Co-Redemptrix Seminary at La Reja in Argentina, which serves Latin America. He became the Superior of the SSPX District of Spain and Portugal in 1994, before becoming the Second Assistant of the Society of Saint Pius X in 2002. During the pontificate of Pope Benedict XVI in 2009, the Holy See officially declared the remission of the SSPX's contested automatic excommunications.

Early life and ministry 
Galarreta was born in 1957 at Torrelavega in Spain, but emigrated early in life with his family to Argentina. In 1975 he entered the seminary at La Plata, where he remained for three years. In October 1978 he entered the Society of St. Pius X's International Seminary of Saint Pius X at Écône in Switzerland.

In August 24, 1980 he was ordained a priest by Archbishop Marcel Lefebvre in La Reja, Buenos Aires. From 1985 to 1988 he was superior of the SSPX district of South America.

Écône consecrations

In June 1988 Archbishop Marcel Lefebvre announced his intention to consecrate de Galarreta and three other priests (Bernard Fellay, Bernard Tissier de Mallerais, and Richard Williamson) as bishops. Lefebvre did not have a pontifical mandate for these consecrations (i.e. permission from the pope), normally required by Canon 1382 of the Code of Canon Law. On June 17, 1988 Cardinal Bernardin Gantin, prefect of the Congregation for Bishops sent the four priests a formal canonical warning that he would automatically incur the penalty of excommunication if they were to be consecrated by Lefebvre without papal permission.

On June 30, 1988 de Galarreta and the three other priests were consecrated bishop by Archbishop Lefebvre and Bishop Antônio de Castro Mayer. On July 1, 1988 Cardinal Gantin issued a declaration stating that Lefebvre, de Castro Mayer, de Galarreta, and the three other newly-ordained bishops "have incurred ipso facto the excommunication latae sententiae reserved to the Apostolic See".

On July 2, 1988, Pope John Paul II issued the motu proprio Ecclesia Dei, in which he reaffirmed the excommunication, and described the consecration as an act of "disobedience to the Roman pontiff in a very grave matter and of supreme importance for the unity of the Church", and that "such disobedience — which implies in practice the rejection of the Roman primacy — constitutes a schismatic act".
Cardinal Darío Castrillón Hoyos, head of the commission responsible for implementing Ecclesia Dei, has said this resulted in a "situation of separation, even if it was not a formal schism."

The SSPX denied the validity of the excommunications, saying that the consecrations were necessary due to a moral and theological crisis in the Catholic Church.

SSPX Bishop

Following his episcopal consecration Galarreta was appointed rector of the seminary of La Reja. In 1991, he assisted in the consecration of Licínio Rangel as bishop for the Priestly Society of Saint John Mary Vianney after the death of its founder, Bishop Antônio de Castro Mayer.

In 1994 he became superior of the Society of Saint Pius X district of Spain and Portugal. In 2002 he became second assistant of the Society.

By a decree of 21 January 2009 (protocol number 126/2009), which was issued in response to a renewed request that Bishop Fellay made on behalf of all four bishops whom Lefebvre had consecrated on 30 June 1988, the prefect of the Congregation for bishops, by the power expressly granted to him by Pope Benedict XVI, remitted the automatic excommunication that they had thereby incurred, and expressed the wish that this would be followed speedily by full communion of the whole of the Society of Saint Pius X with the Church, thus bearing witness, by the proof of visible unity, to true loyalty and true recognition of the pope's magisterium and authority.

The canonical situation of the four bishops thus supposedly became the same as that of the other clergy of the Society, who are suspended a divinis.

It was reported that bishop de Galarreta had been named chairman of the SSPX commission in charge of the theological discussions with the Holy See.

See also

References

External links
Society of St. Pius X

1957 births
Living people
People from Torrelavega
Clergy from Cantabria
Spanish Roman Catholic priests
Traditionalist Catholic bishops
Members of the Society of Saint Pius X
Spanish traditionalist Catholics
Argentine traditionalist Catholics
People temporarily excommunicated by the Catholic Church
Catholicism-related controversies
Écône consecrations